Avon is a commune in the Seine-et-Marne department in the Île-de-France region in north-central France.

Geography
Avon and Fontainebleau, together with three other smaller communes, form an urban area of 36,713 inhabitants. The two towns share a common boundary, whereas other miscellaneous smaller villages are scattered around in the forest that surrounds them (one of the largest in France). Avon is built between two hills; one of them, known as the Butte Montceau, supports the homonymous neighbourhood, made of small blocks and houses; on the opposite one is built the Fougères neighbourhood, consisting of larger buildings. The rest of the town consists mainly of small houses, in the neighbourhoods of La Vallée and Vieil Avon.
As previously said, the town is nested in the Fontainebleau forest; it is bordered on one side by the Seine river, crossed over by the Pont de Valvins.

Demographics
The inhabitants are called the Avonnais.

Places of interest
The main attraction in the town is the old, Romanesque church of St. Pierre, where the 18th-century French mathematician Étienne Bézout was buried. Another historically relevant place is the Prieuré des Basses Loges, where Georges Gurdjieff lived and taught in the early twenties; he is buried in the town cemetery, along with writer Katherine Mansfield who died of tuberculosis while attending his teachings.

Transportation
Avon is served by the Fontainebleau-Avon station on the Transilien Paris – Lyon.

See also
Communes of the Seine-et-Marne department

References

External links

Official site 
1999 Land Use, from IAURIF (Institute for Urban Planning and Development of the Paris-Île-de-France région) 
 

Communes of Seine-et-Marne